The Riverside Quarter, or Riverside Exchange, is one of Sheffield's 11 designated City Centre Quarters, situated by the River Don.  Its borders are West Bar, Coulston Street, Bridge Street, Castlegate, Exchange Place and the Parkway to its south, the Wicker Viaduct, Johnson Street, Spitalfields and Nursery Street to the North, and Corporation Street to the west.  It is named after the Whitbread Exchange Brewery, which was formerly located on the site of the current developments, and incorporates the Victoria Quays.

History 
In the 1760s, one of the earliest integrated steelworks in the world was set up on the site of what is now the Riverside Exchange. A brewery was founded in the area by Tennant Brothers in 1852, and by then there were already four different steelworks there. The brewery grew, however, and took up more and more of the area, and as Sheffield's steel industry plummeted in the mid-20th century and the steelworks were shut down, the brewery was free to expand and it soon took up most of the current area of the Riverside Exchange.

In 1962, the Exchange Brewery was taken over by Whitbread & Co Ltd. However, as the importance of the area decreased due to the closure of the Sheffield Wicker goods station and the loss of tram connections to the area, the brewery shut down in 1993.

In the late 1990s, plans were made by Sheffield's city council to redevelop the Exchange Brewery's area. The area now has more than 300 new apartments, built between 2003 and 2005, and some large office blocks. The area has been made pedestrian-friendly by the construction of the Upper Don Walk, a walkway parallel to Bridge Street along the river Don, and a pedestrian bridge linking the new developments to Nursery Street on the other side of the river.

The development of the Riverside Exchange neighbourhood continues, with planned new developments such as more office space, shops and cafés. There are also schemes for Nursery Street to be pedestrianised. The final northern section of Sheffield's Inner Relief Road, finished in 2008, shifts traffic away from Bridge Street and further increases the neighbourhood's desirability.

Another development, the West Bar scheme is to be based in the quarter.  This is planned to extend the city centre's retail offering, and will also contribute new apartments and office space, and is based around the Sheffield law courts.

References 
 The Artful Lodger. Review on Riverside Exchange, Coode, in 'Online Guide to City Living in Sheffield'. Retrieved 14 October 2005.
 YinLin Chen, Victoria Molton and Andrew Johnston. Changing Face of Sheffield – Whitbread. Retrieved 14 October 2005.
 Sheffield City Council. First step for Sheffield's historic riverside. Press release, 1 October 2003.
 Sheffield City Council. Inner Relief Road (Stage 2) – Wicker to Penistone Road. Retrieved 14 October 2005.

Sheffield City Centre (quarters)